Romas may refer to:

Geography
 Romãs, Decermilo e Vila Longa, a freguesia (civil parish) of Sátão, Portugal

People
 the Romani people

Given name
 Romas Dalinkevičius (1950-2001), Lithuanian painter.
 Romas Dressler (born 1987), German footballer
 Romas Kalanta (1953–1972), Lithuanian high school student and protester
 Romas Kirveliavičius (born 1988), Lithuanian-Austrian handball player
 Romas Kukalis, Canadian painter
 Romas Lileikis, Lithuanian poet, musician, and film director
 Romas Mažeikis (born 1964), Lithuanian footballer
 Romas Petrukanecas (born 1973), Lithuanian sprint canoer
 Romas Zabarauskas (born 1990), Lithuanian film director, screenwriter and producer
 Romas Ubartas (born 1960), Lithuanian discus thrower

Surname
 Jacques de Romas (1713-1776), French physicist
 Haris Romas (born 1960), Greek actor, screenwriter, and lyricist

Other 
 Tony Roma's, international restaurant chain

See also
 Roma (disambiguation)

Lithuanian masculine given names